Baron Hill may refer to:

People
 Baron Hill (politician) (born 1953), Representative for Indiana

Baronies
 Baron Hill, a subsidiary title of Viscount Hill
 Edward Hill, Baron Hill of Wivenhoe (Ted Hill, 1899–1969), British trade unionist and life peer
 Charles Hill, Baron Hill of Luton (1904–1989), British physician, politician, television executive and life peer
 Jonathan Hill, Baron Hill of Oareford (born 1960), British politician, EU Commissioner and life peer
 Baron Hill of Kilwarlin, subsidiary title of Marquess of Downshire
 Baron Hill of Olderfleet, subsidiary title of Viscount Dungannon

Places
 Baron Hill, Anglesey, in Wales
 Barón Hill, a hill within the city of Valparaiso

See also
 Hill (surname)
 All pages with titles containing "Baron Hill"
 Baron Hill-Norton
 Lord Hill (disambiguation)

Hill
Hill
Hill
Hill
Hill
Hill
Hill
Hill